Hyderabad Blues is a 1998 Indian drama film written, directed, and produced by Nagesh Kukunoor.  Primarily shot in the English language, the film explores culture clash from an Indian American's perspective, vacationing back home in Hyderabad, India and finding himself a foreigner in his own land. 
The film starred non-mainstream actors, including Kukunoor in his directorial and acting debut, as well as his family members and friends. The film heralded new age Indian independent cinema.

Hyderabad Blues was premiered at the Eros International Mini Theatre, Mumbai; the Denver Film Festival, the "View From Abroad" section of the First MAMI Film Festival; as well as the National Centre for the Performing Arts in Mumbai. It was premiered as a three part television series in Doordarshan.

Hyderabad Blues garnered the "Audience Award for best film" at the Peachtree International Film Festival in Atlanta, as well as the Rhode Island International Film Festival. In 2018, Hyderabad Blues, celebrated its 20th anniversary with a special screening in Mumbai by "Drishyam Films" where it was featured in the "Indie Film Masters" edition. Hyderabad Blues was followed up by its direct sequel Hyderabad Blues 2 which was released in 2004.

Plot
The protagonist of Hyderabad Blues is Varun, played by the director, Nagesh Kukunoor. The movie revolves around his visit to his homeland after 12 years in the USA and his resulting culture shock. The movie is a romantic comedy, following Varun's attempts to romance an Indian doctor and balance the local customs of arranged marriage with the Western tradition of dating. The dialogue is primarily in English and Telugu, with some Hindi spoken as well.

Cast
Nagesh Kukunoor as Varun Naidu 
Rajashree as Ashwini Rao 
Elahe Hiptoola as Seema Rao 
Vikram Inamdar as Sanjeev Rao 
Anoop Ratnaker Rao as Harish Chandani 
D V Ramana as Darshan Naidu 
Revathi Alwar as Kusuma Naidu 
Anne Chengappa as Shashi Naidu 
Zain-Ul-Wara Zaheer as Sandhya 
Vidhya Uthappa as Woman riding scooter

Production
In producing the movie, Nagesh Kukunoor invested the money he made from his engineering career in the United States. It was made on a shoe-string budget of Rs. 1.7 million (roughly equivalent to U.S. $ 40,000) and shot in 17 days entirely in Hyderabad, India.

Release
The film performed well commercially.

References

External links
 

1998 films
Films set in Hyderabad, India
Indian drama films
Films about Indian Americans
English-language Indian films
Films about immigration to the United States
Indian independent films
1990s Telugu-language films
1990s Hindi-language films
Asian-American drama films
1998 directorial debut films
Films directed by Nagesh Kukunoor
1998 independent films
Hindi-language drama films
1990s English-language films
1990s Indian films